Heman the Ezrahite ( Hēmān hā’Ezrāḥī) is the author of Psalm 88 in the Hebrew Bible, according to the Psalm's colophon.

B. Bava Batra connects the name Heman to the semitic root אמנ (ʔ-m-n) meaning "trusted," while CYDA speculates it is from נתן and means "given." It is found sixteen times in the New International Version of the Bible. The ethnonym is sometimes understood to mean "of Zerah," with the aleph prosthetic, to mean "of Ezrah," or, alternatively, to mean "the native" who founded a tradition of bards.

Heman the Ezrahite may be one of the three Levites assigned by King David to be ministers of music. This Heman was a grandson of Samuel the prophet who went on to become King David's seer and to have fourteen sons and three daughters.

Works
Psalm 88 seems to have been written in a state of despair. According to Martin Marty, a professor of church history at the University of Chicago, Psalm 88 is “a wintry landscape of unrelieved bleakness.”

Nevertheless, the appeal to God in Psalm 88 begins with the following expression of faith: "O Yahweh, God of my salvation!" Three times (vss. 1, 9, and 13) the psalmist calls on the name of Yahweh. The psalmist accompanies each invocation with a reference to his perseverance in prayer. For example, in verse nine he declares, "I call on you, O Yahweh, every day."

See also
 Ethan (biblical figure)

In literature
Madeleine L'Engle has a poem called "Herman the Ezragite: Psalm 88:18" in her collection A Cry Like a Bell. In it, she imagines the feelings of Heman (Herman) that led him to write Psalm 88.

References

Hebrew Bible people
Psalms
Samuel
Tribe of Levi